Matúš Chovan (born 14 February 1992) is a Slovak ice hockey player who is currently playing for the HC 19 Humenné of the Slovak 1. Liga.

Career
Chovan was playing junior ice hockey for his hometown club HC Košice. He made his Extraliga debut in the 2010–11 season. He was a member of the HK Orange 20 project for which played 21 games and earned 5 points.

International play
Chovan participated at the 2012 World Junior Ice Hockey Championships, earning 6 points (5+1) in 6 games.

Career statistics

Regular season and playoffs

International

References

External links
 
http://cracovia.pl/hokej/mecze/zespoly/pierwsza_druzyna

1992 births
Living people
Sportspeople from Topoľčany
Slovak ice hockey centres
HC '05 Banská Bystrica players
HC 07 Detva players
HC Košice players
HC Prešov players
MKS Cracovia (ice hockey) players
HK Spišská Nová Ves players
Expatriate ice hockey players in Poland
Slovak expatriate ice hockey people